Separation property may refer to:

 Separation property (finance), a concept used to simplify the process of building a portfolio of financial assets
 Prewellordering in mathematics, a component of set theory
 Separation axiom in mathematics, a concept in topology